USS Illinois (SSN-786) is a  nuclear powered attack submarine in the United States Navy. She was built by the Electric Boat division of General Dynamics, the third of their Block III variants which feature a revised bow and technology from the converted sub-class of  guided missile submarines (SSGN). The contract for the build was awarded on 22 December 2008 to Huntington Ingalls Industries in partnership with Electric Boat, and construction commenced with the keel laying ceremony on 2 June 2014, at their yard in Groton, Connecticut. First Lady Michelle Obama served as the ship's sponsor, and christened the boat on 10 October 2015. Illinois was launched on 8 August 2015 and completed sea trials on 2 August 2016. She was delivered to the Navy on 27 August 2016 and commissioned in a ceremony at Naval Submarine Base New London on 29 October 2016. Then-First Lady Michelle Obama, as the sponsor, attended the ceremony and is considered to be an honorary member of the crew due to her support of military families and her involvement with the Illinois crew and their families.

History
Illinois completed a change of homeport from Naval Submarine Base New London to Naval Base Pearl Harbor on 22 November 2017, where she is assigned to Submarine Squadron One

Ship's crest
The official ship's crest was designed by Christopher Durdle of Roseville, IL and accepted by the Navy at an unveiling ceremony at the Union League Club of Chicago on 2 April 2015.  First Lady Michelle Obama congratulated the contest finalists and crew via video at the ceremony.

References

Further reading
 Christley, Jim. US Nuclear Submarines: The Fast Attack. Oxford: Osprey Pub., 2007.  
 Clancy, Tom, and John Gresham. Submarine: A Guided Tour Inside a Nuclear Warship. New York, N.Y.: Berkley Books, 2002.  
 Gresham, John, and Ian Westwell. Seapower. Edison, NJ.: Chartwell Books, 2004.

External links

 Navy Names Five New Submarines
 Virginia Class Attack Submarine - SSN
 Navy Lays Keel for Virginia-Class Submarine Illinois
 First Lady Named Sponsor of New Navy Submarine, USS ILLINOIS
 USS Illinois Commissioning Committee Presentation at the Pritzker Military Museum & Library
 786 Club – Civilian Support Organization for the Crew of SSN 786

 

Virginia-class submarines
Nuclear submarines of the United States Navy
Ships built in Groton, Connecticut